Barium azide is an inorganic azide with the formula . It is a barium salt of hydrazoic acid. Like most azides, it is explosive. It is less sensitive to mechanical shock than lead azide.

Preparation
Barium azide may be prepared by reacting sodium azide with a soluble barium salt. Care should be taken to prevent large crystals from forming in the solution as barium azide crystals will explode if subjected to friction/shock or if fully dried. The product should be stored submerged in ethanol.

Uses
Barium azide can be used to make azides of magnesium, sodium, potassium, lithium, rubidium and zinc with their respective sulfates.

It can also be used as a source for high purity nitrogen by heating:

This reaction liberates metallic barium, which is used as a getter in vacuum applications.

See also
Calcium azide
Sodium azide
Hydrazoic acid

References

Azides
Barium compounds
Explosive chemicals
Inorganic compounds